Polypoetes sumaco is a moth of the family Notodontidae. It is found in eastern Ecuador.

The length of the forewings is 12–13 mm for males and 12.5 mm for females. The ground color of the forewings is brown to light brown, but slightly darker along the anal margin. The scale covering is somewhat sparse. The hindwings are brown to light brown.

Etymology
The species name refers to the type locality: Cerro Sumaco in Napo, Ecuador.

References

Moths described in 2008
Notodontidae of South America